Lake Magadi, also spelled Lake Magad, is a shallow soda lake in the southwest of the Ngorogoro crater in northern Tanzania, is often inhabited by thousands of mainly lesser flamingoes. The lake's name comes from the word for salty in the Maasai language. It is  1730 metres above sea level.

References 

Magadi